Condé-Northen is a commune in the Moselle department in Grand Est in north-eastern France.

Localities of the commune: 
Condé (German: Contchen), 
Northen (German: Northen),
Loutremange (German: Lautermingen), 
Pontigny (German: Niedbrücken).

Condé-Northen is located on the road from Saarlouis to Metz (D 954), about five kilometers southwest of Boulay-Moselle and about 30 kilometers from the border with Saarland. The two source rivers of the Nied, the German Nied (Nied Allemande) and the French Nied (Nied Française), unite in Condé-Northen.

See also
 Communes of the Moselle department

References

External links
 

Condenorthen